Amrita TV is an Indian Malayalam Language general Entertainment television channel owned by Mata Amritanandamayi Math. It was launched in 2005.

Theme song
The theme song, "Lokasamastha," was composed by Rahulraj for Mata Amritanandamayi's 50th birthday celebrations in 2003 and later taken as the theme of Amrita TV.

Current shows

Former shows

Serials
Aliyanmarum Penganmarum
Aliyan VS Aliyan
Anamika
Anveshi
Aranazhika Neram
Aparichitha
Ardhachandrante Rathri
Ayyappa Saranam
Chandrakkala Manathu
Chila nerangalil Chila Manushyar
Chirikidathom
Chitrasalabham
Decemberile Akasham
Devangana
Ithal
Ithalukal
Jagritha
Kaatukurangu
Kaaligandaki
Kalthamara
Koottu Kudumbam
Krishna Kripa Sagaram
Kshnaprabhachanchalam
Kunjiyammaku Anjumakkalane
Kumarasambhavam
Kurukshethram
Mukhariyaathe Kadhayariyaathe
Ohari
Pakalmazha
Pakalveedu
Padmasree Padmavathi
Sree Padmanabham
Ulladakkam
Swaram
Sathi Leelavathy
Thaniye
Three Kutties
Thingalum Tharangalum
Thacholi Othenan
Thonnyaksharangal	
Mowgli
Nilavum Nakshtrangalum
Nizhalum Nilavum Parayunnath
Vaadakakku oru Hrudayam
Ponnu Poloru Pennu
Padmasree Padmavathy
Ithal
MT Kadhakal
The Officer
Ormayil
Paavaakoothu
Ganesh leela
Om namah Shivay
Back Benchers
In jawahar Colony
Sandhyaragam
Sasneham
Satyam Sivam Sundaram
Shreepadmanabham
Suryakaladi
Swaram
Ponnum Poovum
Ponnu Poloru Pennu
Jagratha
Just Fun Chumma season 1,2
Sasneham 
Snehita
Sindhooracheppu
Vadakakku Oru Hridayam
Vishnupuranam

Reality shows
Immini balya fan
Super Star (seasons 1, 2, 3, Global, The Ultimate)
Super Star Junior (seasons 1, 2, 3, 4, Jn)
Super Dancer (seasons 1–5)
Super Dancer Junior (seasons 1–7)
Super Model
Let's Dance (seasons 1–3)
Vanitharathnam (seasons 1–3)
Deva sangeetham
Ragarathnam
Ragarathnam Junior
Super Model
Kasavu Thattam
Onamelam
Little Kitchen
Best Actor
Kerala Dance League
Super Dupe
Sreshtabharatam

Shows
List of Vijay Films Malayalam dubbed:Kushi 
Thulatha Manamum Thullam 
Bagavathi 
Priyamaanavale 
Priyamudan 
Sachein
Shahjahan 
Badri
Minsara kanna
Kannakul nilavu 
Samagamam
Sangeetha Samagamam
Taste of Kerala
Shoot and Track
Ezhamakadalinakkare
q-Matrix
Junior Genius
Swarnamazha
Swarnachamaram
Shrutilayam
Bikes & Cars
Movie Cafe
Directors Special
Favorites
One in Millions
Silver Screen
Projector
Lal Salam (talk show)
Big Break
Tasty travel with Annie
Annieyude ruchikootukal
Comedy masala
Orumikkam Punarsrishtikkayi 
Grand Magical Circus
Autumn leaf
Unarnunna Keralam
Njananu Sthree
Samantha ram
Star Family
Jananayakan
Kadhayallithu Jeevitham
Malayali Durbar
Annie's Kitchen
Priyapetta Natukare
Sruthilayam

Availability

Amrita TV's global footprint currently covers besides India, Asia, Middle East, America, Australia and Europe. Amrita TV is a free-to-air channel. Also accessible on internet and similar platforms.

References

Availability of Amrita TV in Kerala on Airtel digital TV

External links
 Amrita TV Official Site

Malayalam-language television channels
Television stations in Thiruvananthapuram
Television channels and stations established in 2005
2005 establishments in Kerala